Hydrelia ochrearia is a moth in the family Geometridae first described by John Henry Leech in 1897. It is found in China.

References

Moths described in 1897
Asthenini
Moths of Asia